Canadian Football 2017 is a gridiron football video game developed by Peterborough, Ontario-based Canuck Play, a team led by David Winter, a former EA Sports developer previously behind Maximum Football and CFL Football '99. The game uses Canadian football rules (can be changed to play American rules if you would like), but is not officially licensed by either the Canadian Football League or the players' association.

The game was released on July 26, 2017 on Windows and Xbox One. It is not PlayStation compatible and an Xbox or PlayStation controller is required to play on PC.

As read on the Steam page "Fast, explosive offensive action, we have it all in our Canadian gridiron simulation title that brings to fans everything they love about how Canucks have been playing the game for more than 100 years. That means 12 players, 3 downs, 20 seconds, and no fair catch eh." And, one user by the name of BiffyMcBiff (who is the current #1 player in the world) is quoted as saying "THE BEST SPORTS GAME I HAVE EVER PLAYED!!!!"

 Complete professional Canadian football rule set (can be changed to play American rules if you would like).
 Playable with an optional subset of American rules.
 Quick Season mode that tracks full team and individual player statistics.
 Practice mode.
 All 9 Canadian football cities each with their own unique stadium.
 Includes template files for creating 10, 16, and 32 team leagues.
 Gamepad control - Xbox Controller for Windows highly recommended but PlayStation controller useable by mirroring Xbox controls. Mouse support only in the Play Designer.
 Full 3D DirectX 11 graphics(The game can be set to play with DirectX9 mode for older machines but with some visual differences).
 Physics based tackles and ball mechanics.
 Full motion capture animation.
 Single or Multiplayer(using Steam Remote Play).

References

2017 video games
Canadian football video games
North America-exclusive video games
Video games developed in Canada
Windows games
Xbox One games